Cymbopappus is a genus of flowering plants in the daisy family.

 Species
All the species are endemic to South Africa
 Cymbopappus adenosolen (Harv.) B.Nord. - Cape Provinces
 Cymbopappus hilliardiae B.Nord. - KwaZulu-Natal
 Cymbopappus piliferus (Thell.) B.Nord. - Limpopo

References

Anthemideae
Asteraceae genera
Flora of the Cape Provinces
Endemic flora of South Africa